Protected areas of Denmark comprise a number of various current designations across Denmark proper, including Natura 2000, EU habitats areas and Ramsar areas.

By municipality 
 List of protected areas of Aarhus Municipality
 List of protected areas of Bornholm
 List of protected areas of Frederikssund Municipality
 List of protected areas of Gribskov Municipality
 List of protected areas of Halsnæs Municipality
 List of protected areas of Hillerød Municipality
 List of protected areas of Lejre Municipality
 List of protected areas of Roskilde Municipality

National parks 
There are four national parks in Denmark proper and two areas has been nominated.
 List of national parks of Denmark

External links